Agonum impressum is a species of ground beetles in the subfamily Platyninae.

Description
The upper part of the body is of copper, bronze, or green colour. Rarely, the species have two-tone colour. The elytron have five to seven very large, and bright gaps.

Ecology
The species live mostly near the water. It is found in several locations throughout Europe and Asia, including in the Mordovia region.

References

Beetles described in 1796
impressum
Beetles of Asia
Beetles of Europe